is a Japanese wrestler. He competed in the men's Greco-Roman 63 kg at the 2000 Summer Olympics.

References

1969 births
Living people
Japanese male sport wrestlers
Olympic wrestlers of Japan
Wrestlers at the 2000 Summer Olympics
Sportspeople from Yamagata Prefecture
Asian Wrestling Championships medalists